Zeitgehöft (which can be rendered in English as Timestead) is a German-language poetry collection by Paul Celan, published posthumously in 1976.

References

1976 poetry books
Poetry by Paul Celan
German poetry collections
Suhrkamp Verlag books